H. Wesley Perkins (born  1950) is Professor of Sociology at Hobart and William Smith Colleges in Geneva, New York.  He is known as the "father of social norms marketing," which is based on his theoretical formulations and development.

The social norms marketing approach is widely used to reduce alcohol consumption and abuse among college and university students. Perkins continues to develop and test new techniques to implement the approach as well as to expand its applicability to other social problems. He conducts extensive research and his most recent book is The Social Norms Approach to Preventing School and College Age Substance Abuse.

References
Social Norms Pioneer H. Wesley Perkins to Visit UMC October 29-30

1950 births
Living people
American sociologists
Hobart and William Smith Colleges faculty